The discography of the American Christian rock band Skillet consists of 11 studio albums, 4 EPs, 2 live albums, 3 compilation albums, and 70 radio singles with 21 reaching No. 1 on at least one chart.

Studio albums

Video albums

Live albums

Compilation albums

Extended plays

Singles

1990s

Early 2000s

Late 2000s

Early 2010s

Late 2010s

Early 2020s

Promotional singles

Other charted songs

Music videos

Compilation appearances

Notes

References

Discographies of American artists
Rock music group discographies
Christian music discographies